Count  was a Bakumatsu period Japanese samurai, and the 14th and final daimyō of Sendai Domain in the Tōhoku region of northern Japan, and the 30th hereditary chieftain of the Date clan.

Biography
Munemoto second son of Date Yoshikuni. His childhood name was Kamesaburō (亀三郎). In 1868, following the defeat of the Ōuetsu Reppan Dōmei in the Boshin War of the Meiji Restoration, Yoshikuni resigned his offices and went into voluntary retirement and seclusion in Tokyo. The new Meiji government permitted the two-year-old Munemoto to become daimyō of Sendai Domain, but penalized the domain severely for its participation in the rebellion by reducing its kokudaka from 620,000 to 280,000 koku. The actual kokudaka of the reduced Sendai Domain was actually even less, and has been estimated at only 100,000 koku. 

In 1869, the office of daimyō was abolished by the new government, and Munemoto was made appointive imperial governor of Sendai. In 1870, he yielded this position to his adoptive brother Date Muneatsu, but retained the post of clan leader.

He was married to the daughter of Matsura Akira, daimyō of Hirado Domain, by whom he had one daughter.

In 1884, Munemoto was created count (hakushaku) in the new Japanese kazoku peerage system. He was advanced to Third Court Rank in 1911 and Second Court Rank in 1917. On his death in 1917, the post of clan chieftain went to his younger brother Date Kunimune.

Family
 Father: Date Yoshikuni
 Mother: Matsuoka Michiko (Okatsu-no-kata)
 Wife: Matsura Kuniko, 3rd daughter of Matsura Akira, daimyō of Hirado Domain
1st daughter: Eiko (1894-1945), married to Count Ueno Masao, 6th son of Prince Kitashirakawa Yoshihisa

References
Papinot, Edmond. (1948). Historical and Geographical Dictionary of Japan. New York: Overbeck Co.

External links
Sendai Domain on "Edo 300 HTML" (3 November 2007) 

1866 births
Tozama daimyo
1917 deaths
Kazoku
Meiji Restoration
People from Sendai Domain
People of Meiji-period Japan
Date clan